Qasemabad (also Romanized as Qāsemābād) is a village in Kuh Panah Rural District, in the Central District of Tafresh County, Markazi Province, Iran. At the 2006 census, its population was 74, in 25 families.

References 

Populated places in Tafresh County